Fusiturricula taurina is a species of sea snail, a marine gastropod mollusk in the family Drilliidae.

Description
The size of an adult shell varies between 9 mm and 13 mm.

Distribution
This species occurs in the demersal zone of Brazil.

References

 Olsson, Axel A. "The Miocene of Northern Costa Rica." Bulletins of American Paleontology 9.39 (1922): 1–168.

External links
 

taurina
Gastropods described in 1922